Calamotropha cleopatra is a moth in the family Crambidae. It was described by Stanisław Błeszyński in 1961. It is found in Kenya and Tanzania.

References

Crambinae
Moths described in 1961